Karthyayani Devi Temple, Cherthala is a famous Hindu temple located at Cherthala. Iratti and Thadi are the famous vazhipadu, Cherthala pooram is the second famous pooram in Kerala. Kalabham, in familywise, can be held on there, kalabham is a famous vazhipadu.

Legends and Beliefs
It is believed that the famous Indian Saint Vilwamangalam Swamiyar consecrated Devi in this temple. While he was going back after consecrating 'Padmanabha Swamy' at Sree Padmanabha Swamy Temple, Thiruvananthapuram he saw Devi at this place and consecrated her in this place is the popular belief.
The deity 'Cherthala Karthyayani Devi' is famous as 'Mangalya Dayini' in the sense she provides welfare and prosperity for her devotees and removes obstacles for the marriage of young girls.

Deities and Sub Deities
The main deity is Karthyayani Devi and the sub deity 'Dharma Sastha' who is Ayyappan is also having importance in this temple. Lord Shiva and Krishna is also worshipped here.

Offerings
Archana, Rakta Pushpanjali (flower offerings),Swayamvara Pushpanjali, Muzhukappu (adorning the deity with sandalwood paste),and so on for the Devi. For Lord Sastha 'Neerajanam' and a special offering known as 'Aalthadi' is performed.
The 'Vazhipadu'(Offering) 'Aalthadi' is offered by the devotees in the belief that their physical ailments will be removed.
'Thalappoli' is also an important offering here: a lighted oil lamp is placed on a flower decorated plate and women carry them accompanying Devi's processions etc.

Festivals
Usually in other temples of Kerala, during the annual festival, 'Aarattu' is a ritual held once annually. At Chottanikara Devi Temple Aarattu is held every day during festival. At Cherthala Karthyayani Temple 'Aarattu' is held twice every day during the annual festival.
Karthika Star day in the Malayalam month of Vrichikam is also well celebrated.

See also
Anandavalleeswaram Temple, Kollam
Sreevaraham Lakshmi Varaha Temple, Thiruvananthapuram

References

External links
Cherthala Karthyayani Devi Temple-http://kerala-delightfulartsandculture.blogspot.in/2012/03/cherthala-karthyayani-devi-temple.html

Hindu temples in Alappuzha district
Devi temples in Kerala